Nanchang Hangkong University, also Nanchang Aviation University, is located in Nanchang City, Jiangxi, People's Republic of China. It is an engineering-based multidisciplinary university. It was Nanchang Institute of Aeronautical Technology and it was renamed in Feb. 2007. It is a higher education institute with a distinctive feature of aeronautics and national defense under the joint supervision of Jiangxi Provincial Government and Ministry of Industry and Information Technology of the People's Republic of China.

NCHU has over 1,200 professional teachers. The total number of registered students is currently 21,000, of which 19,000 are undergraduates, 1,095 are postgraduates, and over 1,200 are vocational students. NCHU gives priority to the all-around development of students as well as the quality of education and directs its efforts to teaching innovations. As a result, it has made great achievements in the cultivation of talents and its employment rate of graduate ranks first in Jiangxi Province.

Description
NCHU adheres to the development of engineering advantaged discipline and aviation characteristic majors. Currently, it has 10 key disciplines in Jiangxi Province, which are Materials Processing Engineering, Measuring and Testing Technologies and Instruments, Environmental Engineering, Manufacturing Engineering of Aerospace Vehicle, Materials Science, Control Theory and Control Engineering, Optical Engineering, Ideological and Political Education, Material Physics and Chemistry and Computer Applied Technology.

One top priority discipline in Jiangxi province, which is the Manufacturing Engineering of Aerospace Vehicle.

One national defense key discipline, which is Environmental Engineering.

Nine key laboratories (research centers) at the provincial (ministerial) level, which are Key Laboratory of Nondestructive Test (Ministry of Education), Key Laboratory of Light Alloy Fabrication Science and Technology for National Defense (State Commission of Science and Technology for National Defense Industry), Key Laboratory of Aeronautical Detection and Evaluation (China Aviation Industry ), Key Laboratory of Aerial Material Hot Working (China Aviation Industry), Research Center for Materials Science and Engineering in Jiangxi Province, Key University Laboratory of Corrosion and Protection in Jiangxi Province, Research Center of Testing Technology and Control Engineering in Jiangxi Province, Research Center of University Ideological and Political Theory Course Education in Jiangxi Province and Promotion Center of Rapid Prototyping Productivity in Jiangxi Province.

Three provincial key bases, which are Demonstration Cultivation Base of Cooperation by Production, Study and Research on Computing and Information Technology in Jiangxi Province, Demonstration Cultivation Base of Cooperation by Production, Study and Research on Materials Science and Technology and Research Base of Sports Culture (State Sport General Administration).

Majors
Three national specialty majors, which are Metallic Materials Engineering, Technique, and Instrumentation of Measurements, and Electronic Information Engineering.

Twelve provincial brand majors, which are Metallic Materials Engineering, Technique and Instrumentation of Measurements, Material Forming and Control Engineering, Environmental Engineering, Electronic Information Engineering, Machinery Design and Manufacturing, and Automation, Electronics Science and Technology, Automation, Flight Vehicle Manufacture Engineering, Computer Science And Technology, English and Economics.

Two National Defense Key Construction Majors, which are Flight Vehicle Manufacture Engineering and Optical Engineering.

Four provincial specialty majors, which are Environmental Engineering, Electronics Science and Technology, Flight Vehicle Manufacture Engineering, and Computer Science And Technology.

Teaching
Four provincial teaching teams, which are teaching team of Metallic Materials Engineering, teaching team of non-destructive testing technology, teaching team of Engineering Training Center, and teaching team of Applied Chemistry.

In NCHU, there are also 2 national experimental teaching demonstration centers, including Engineering Training Center and College Physics Experimental Teaching Demonstration Center, and 8 provincial experimental teaching demonstration centers.

NCHU has positively carried out international cooperation and exchanges of various forms and has built a long-term relationship of interscholastic cooperation with Japan, Canada, Ukraine, the UK, Australia, France, Finland, and South Korea. Foreign teachers and experts are invited to teach here throughout the year.

Awards
In recent years, NCHU has successively won many titles of honor, including "Unit with Significant Contribution in the 40th Anniversary of Aviation Industry Establishment", "Advanced Unit in Aviation Industry", "Advanced Unit of Cultural and Ideological Progress and Cohesion Project in Aviation Industry", "Civilized Unit in Jiangxi Province", "Advanced Grass-roots Party Organization in Jiangxi Province", "Advanced Unit in Afforestation in Jiangxi Province", "Advanced Unit in Campus Construction in Jiangxi Province", "Advanced Unit in Party Construction and Ideological And Political Work in Jiangxi Province", "National Model Staff Family" and "National Advanced Unit in Military Training".

See also
Nanchang University

References

External links
Nanchang Hangkong University
 Nanchang Hangkong University 

1952 establishments in China
Universities in Nanchang